The Albanian National Football Championship for Women (Albanian: Kampionati Kombëtar i Futbollit për Femra), primarily referred to as the Albanian Women's National Championship, is the highest division of women's football in Albania. The league is the female equivalent to the men's Kategoria Superiore and the current season is contested by 10 clubs.

History
Although football is considered one of the most popular sports in Albania, women's football has historically been non evident in the country until 2007, when the first ever national tournament was held in Sarandë between the 15th and 18 August as a promotional event for women's football. The teams who participated were amateur sides made up of a selection of players from Tirana, Shkodra, Korça, and Rubik. Six more friendly tournaments were held in the following two years in order to raise the profile of the sport and in order to receive the backing of the Albanian Football Association to start an official competition.

Two years after the first unofficial tournament in Albania, the first official competition was held in the form of a knockout tournament played between the 23rd and 28 January 2009 at the Selman Stërmasi Stadium in Tiranë and the Albanian Football Association Sports Centre in Kamëz. The tournament featured eight teams which were Tirana AS, FC Tropoja, Juban Danja, Olimpik Tirana, Tirana, KF Rubiku, KF Memaliaj and KF The Door Shkodra. The quarter finals were held on 23 January and the semi finals were held on 28 January with the final being held three days later on 28 January at the Selman Stërmasi Stadium. The final was contested between Tirana AS, coached by Altin Rraklli and Juban Danja and ended in a 4–0 win for Tirana AS following goals from Aurora Seranaj, Ana Baro and two goals from Brisida Zaimaj to crown the club the inaugural champions of Albania.

Clubs (2022–23)

Previous winners

By end of 2013 Ada of Velipojë reorganized and merged with players from Shkodër to play from that moment on under the name of Vllaznia. Since Velipojë and Shkodër are two different cities, Ada retains the 3 previously won titles.

By titles

See also
 Albanian Women's Cup
 List of football clubs in Albania

References

External links
Standings at Federation website
League at uefa.com

Top level women's association football leagues in Europe
Women
Sports leagues established in 2007
2007 establishments in Albania
1
Football